This is a list of the administrative heads of Cocos (Keeling) Islands since 23 November 1955, when it became an external territory of the Commonwealth of Australia.

See also

King of the Cocos Islands
List of administrative heads of Christmas Island

References

External links
World StatesmenCocos (Keeling) Islands

Lists of viceroys in Australia
Administrative Heads
Administrative Heads

administrative heads
Lists of office-holders in Australia